The Cimarron River is a  tributary that joins the Gunnison River in Curecanti National Recreation Area near Cimarron, Colorado.  The river's source is the confluence of two forks near Silver Jack Reservoir in the Uncompahgre National Forest.

The Cimarron is fed by the West, Middle, and East forks of the river, respectively.

A Denver & Rio Grande Western narrow gauge trestle is located near the confluence of the Cimarron and the Gunnison.

See also
List of rivers of Colorado
List of tributaries of the Colorado River

References

Gunnison River
Rivers of Colorado
Rivers of Gunnison County, Colorado
Rivers of Montrose County, Colorado
Tributaries of the Colorado River in Colorado